Nueva Concepción is a town, with a population of 15,747 (2018 census), and a municipality in the Escuintla department of Guatemala.

Sports
Deportivo Nueva Concepción football club have been playing in the second tier of Guatemalan football since the 2001/2002 season.

They play their home games in the Estadio Municipal de Nueva Concepción.

References

Municipalities of the Escuintla Department